Trilochan Pokhrel (died 1969) was the first Indian independence activist from Sikkim. In Sikkim and North Bengal, Pokhrel is popularly called 'Bandey Pokhrel'.

Early life 

Pokhrel was born at Tareythang Takchang Busty, in East Sikkim.Trilochan Pokhrel was highly influenced by the movements of Mahatma Gandhi, which were based on the fundamental principles of peace and non-violence. He was actively involved in Gandhi's movements, such as the Non-Cooperation Movement, the Civil Disobedience Movement and the Quit India Movement. Mr. Pokherl had immense faith in the teaching of simple life led by Mahatma Gandhi. Pokhrel is known for propagating the concept of Swadeshi among the Sikkimese peasantry. Late Pokhrel was the first Sikkimese freedom fighter who fought against British hegemony. Actually, Sikkim was a protectorate state of the British. In the year 1861, the signature of the Treaty of Tumlong effectively made Sikkim a de facto protectorate of British India. This had a huge impact on Sikkim's Sovereignty. The appointment of John Claude White, a Political officer established new landholdings in Sikkim. Direct or Indirect influence of Britishers in Sikkim made Trilochan Pokhrel join the mainstream Indian Freedom Moment.

Honours
 2018 - LD Kazi Award for Democratic Movement by Government of Sikkim(Posthumous)

References

1969 deaths
Year of birth missing
People from Pakyong district
Indian Gorkhas
Swadeshi activists
Indian independence activists from Sikkim
Hindu activists